Tyroc is a fictional character in the DC Universe, a member of the Legion of Super-Heroes in the 30th and 31st centuries. Created by writer Cary Bates and artist Mike Grell, he first appeared in Superboy #216 (April 1976), a year before Black Lightning, making him one of DC's first black costumed superheroes.

Publication history
He first appeared in Superboy #216 (April 1976), and was created by Cary Bates and Mike Grell.

Jim Shooter, who had been prevented from introducing black characters into the Legion in the 1960s, objected to the characterization of Tyroc: "...I always wanted to have a character who was African-American, and years later, when they did that, they did it in the worst way possible....instead of just incidentally having a character who happens to be black...they made a big fuss about it. He's a racial separatist....I just found it pathetic and appalling".

According to Mike Grell, who co-created Tyroc with Cary Bates, the character of Tyroc was "sort of a sore spot with me". He had previously tried to introduce black characters into the series, but had been prevented by then-editor Murray Boltinoff. Grell recalled: "I kept getting stalled off...and finally comes Tyroc. They might as well have named him Tyrone. Their explanation for why there were no black people [in the Legion] was that all the black people had gone to live on an island. It's possibly the most racist concept I've ever heard in my life...I mean, it's a segregationist's dream, right? So they named him Tyroc, and gave him the world's stupidest super-power".

Grell's dislike of Tyroc was strong enough that he deliberately made him look ridiculous: "I gave him a silly costume. It was somewhere between Elvis' Las Vegas costume and something you would imagine a pimp on the street corner wearing".

Grell notes that physically, Tyroc is based on the football player Fred Williamson: "I modeled him somewhat on Fred "The Hammer" Williamson, who was a movie star at the time...and gave him this "Elvis Presley goes to Las Vegas" kind of a costume, and that's pretty much it. That was the extent of my contribution to Tyroc".

Some writers like long-time Legion scribe Paul Levitz claimed that Tyroc's powers, based upon sound, made him too difficult a character to depict in a comic book (even though DC's Black Canary appeared in comics for years, as did Marvel Comics' Banshee). Tyroc was the only Legionnaire introduced prior to 1989 who did not appear during Levitz's initial 15-year run on the Legion (even the deceased Ferro Lad, Invisible Kid, and Chemical King appeared in flashback stories). Levitz says this was because he thought Tyroc was "just such a stupid character....a sound-based character is, I think, intrinsically futile in a silent medium. He just never worked for me, so I did my best to dodge him". Despite his initial stance on the character, Levitz said in a Newsarama interview that Tyroc will be in his new Legion of Super-Heroes series. Tyroc appears in Legion of Super-Heroes (vol. 6) #2 (August 2010), marking the first time that the character has appeared in an in-continuity tale written by Levitz.

Fictional character biography

Marzal
Tyroc (real name Troy Stewart) was the only resident superhero of the island of Marzal, which usually existed in a different dimension. Like Brigadoon, Marzal Island would sometimes reappear on Earth. Unlike the legendary Scottish village, Marzal remained on Earth for several years at a time in a location near a coast of Africa. In the native language of Marzal, "Tyroc" means "Scream of the Devil".

Tyroc and his people were descended from African slaves who revolted on a ship during middle passage in the 18th century. Once all the slavers were set adrift, the liberated Africans settled on their own island off the coast of Africa, and built a civilization. Much to their surprise, their island paradise had a "Brigadoon-like" existence and disappeared from this dimension on a regular schedule every 200 years.

Left on their own, the islanders developed an advanced, highly technological civilization, with extreme isolationist tendencies. Marzalians believed that the people of Earth had ignored their island. As a result, outsiders were not welcome on Marzal.

The Legion

The Legion of Super-Heroes first met Tyroc when several Legionnaires responded to an emergency on Marzal Island. At first, Tyroc attempted to stop the Legion from assisting. After patching up their differences and working together to save the island, Tyroc was offered Legion membership. He initially refused, although he had come to admire the tolerance and courage of the Legionnaires he had met.

In later encounters, Tyroc accepted the Legion's offer to join the team and thus became the Legion's first black member. Tyroc and Black Lightning were created to help DC attract new readers and to provide more opportunities for socially relevant stories.

Until Tyroc's addition to the Legion, almost every humanoid alien in Legion stories were drawn with Caucasian facial features, including the orange-skinned Chameleon Boy, the blue-skinned Shadow Lass, and the green-skinned, blonde haired Brainiac 5.

Tyroc later returned to Marzal Island to be with his people when it left the Earth reality. Shadow Lass and Dawnstar, accompanying him, were almost trapped on the island as it shifted dimensions.

President of New Earth
Marzal's destruction at the hands of the Dominion was documented during the fourth volume of the Legion of Super-Heroes series while Keith Giffen was the writer. The Dominators managed to destroy Marzal Island within its dimensional pocket. An Earth recovering from the Dominion takeover chose their war heroes to lead them. Jacques Foccart (the second Invisible Kid) and Troy Stewart, who had proven themselves as effective leaders of the rebel forces, were rewarded with public offices by the people of Earth. Troy Stewart became the planet's vice president, and Jacques became president. Soon thereafter, Earth was destroyed in a disaster reminiscent of the destruction of Krypton over a millennium earlier. A few dozen cities and their inhabitants survived, and the planet was reconstituted as New Earth.  Eventually, Jacques resigned to rejoin the Legion, and Troy ascended to the presidency.

This reality was erased from continuity by the events of the Zero Hour miniseries.

Post-Zero Hour/"Threeboot"
Tyroc did not appear in the Legion's second major continuity, which ran from 1994 through the end of 2004. In the "Threeboot" continuity which began in 2005, Tyroc appears briefly (with several other Legionnaires from previous incarnations of the team such as Blok and Dawnstar) in Legion of Super-Heroes (vol. 5) #15, as a character in a 'campfire story' showing the Legion's influence, and the urban legends and myths that have sprung up around it.  This appearance was a cameo, and does not seem to take place in the series' actual continuity.

Post-Infinite Crisis
The events of the Infinite Crisis miniseries have apparently restored a close analogue of the Pre-Crisis on Infinite Earths Legion to continuity, as seen in "The Lightning Saga" story arc in Justice League of America and Justice Society of America, and in the "Superman and the Legion of Super-Heroes" story arc in Action Comics.  A statue of Tyroc was seen in Final Crisis: Legion of Three Worlds #1. The Pre-Crisis on Infinite Earths Tyroc later appeared along with an entire army of Legionnaires from alternate worlds, times, and realities, at the Vanishing Point to fight the Time Trapper. In the current series of Legion of Super-Heroes, Tyroc has rejoined the Legion.

The New 52
In 2011, DC rebooted its continuity and relaunched all of its titles, among them Legion Lost told of a small team of Legionnaires including Wildfire, Gates, Dawnstar, Tellus, Timber Wolf, Chameleon Girl and Tyroc becoming trapped in the 21st century while pursuing a time-travelling genetic terrorist. After several adventures attempting to integrate with 21st century life, including an altercation with the Teen Titans, DC cancelled the series.

Powers and abilities
Tyroc's superpower was his reality-warping screams, which he could use to create dimensional portals and force fields, and to transmute, freeze, burn or simply destroy objects. He could also teleport himself and at least one other person, although the exact limits of this ability were unknown. The effects and range of his powers were consistent when he first appeared, but later seemed to vary with the writer. Later writers often treated his power as simply being a "sonic scream" similar to that of Black Canary.

Tyroc could fly using either his own inherent powers (as seen in his first appearance before joining the Legion) or his Legion flight ring.

Scream effects
Among the screams in Tyroc's arsenal:
 EEYYAAAHH! – pyrokinesis
 AHHRRRRRR! – force field
 OYYUUUUUU! – teleportation
 ARRRRHHHH! – explosions
 ZZZRRRUUGGHH! – telekinesis
 UIUUIEEEE! – transmutation
 ARRREEEEG! – weather manipulation
 IRRRRWWWW! – plant manipulation
 CCCIIIRRR! – vertigo
 RRRYYYY! – wind manipulation
 WHEEEEW! – retrocognition

Equipment
As a member of the Legion of Super-Heroes, he is provided with a Legion Flight Ring. It allows him to fly and communicate with his teammates.

In other media
 Tyroc makes non-speaking appearances in Legion of Super Heroes. Tyroc has a small cameo at the end of the first season episode "Timber Wolf", with his picture appearing along with those of other Legionnaires as Timber Wolf recites the Legion oath. He later turned up in action during "The Substitutes" and has appeared sporadically in Season 2 background shots. A young Tyroc appears in the second-season episode "In The Beginning", among a crowd of young Legionnaires. In the two-part series finale "Dark Victory", Tyroc is seen in battle using an ultra-sonic howl against Brainiac's forces. The sound waves are colored bright red, and cause a piece of equipment to explode.
 Tyroc appears as a background character in the animated film Justice League vs. the Fatal Five.

Bibliography
 Superboy #216, 218, 222
 All-New Collectors' Edition #C-55 (1978)
 Superboy and the Legion of Super-Heroes #250
 Legion of Super-Heroes (vol. 2) #263–265
 Secrets of the Legion of Super-Heroes #1
 Legion of Super-Heroes (vol. 4) #16, 29, 32, 34–36, 38, 40, 41, 50, 54, 59
 Legionnaires #1, 9, 10, 12
 Valor #22

References

External links 
 World of Black Heroes: Tyroc Biography
 Museum of Black Superheroes entry
 DCU Guide Tyroc chronology
 Fanzing #35: 30th Century Government

DC Comics superheroes
Comics characters introduced in 1976
Fictional characters who can manipulate sound
Fictional characters who can manipulate reality
Characters created by Mike Grell
DC Comics metahumans